Central reservation system may refer to:
 Airline reservations system, the reservation system used by an airline company
 Hotel reservation system, the central reservation system used by the hotel and resort industry
 Computer reservation system, another name for the airline reservation systems used by travel agents